Habenaria heyneana is a species of orchid. This species of orchids found in high attitude areas such as the Western Ghats of India.

References 

heyneana